Girty Run is a stream in the U.S. state of West Virginia.

Girty Run most likely has the name of Simon Girty (1741–1818), an American colonial.

See also
List of rivers of West Virginia

References

Rivers of Brooke County, West Virginia
Rivers of West Virginia